A peplos is a body-length garment established as typical attire for women in ancient Greece by circa 500 BC, during the late Archaic and Classical period. It was a long, rectangular cloth with the top edge folded down about halfway, so that what was the top of the rectangle was now draped below the waist, and the bottom of the rectangle was at the ankle. One side of the peplos could be left open, or pinned or sewn together. In Latin and in a Roman context, it could be called a palla. 

It should not be confused with the Ionic chiton, which was a piece of fabric folded over and sewn together along the longer side to form a tube. The Classical garment is represented in Greek vase painting from the 5th century BC and in the metopes of temples in Doric order.

Spartan women continued to wear the peplos much later in history than other Greek cultures.  It was also shorter and with slits on the side causing other Greeks to call them phainomērídes (φαινομηρίδες), the "thigh-showers".

Rituals

On the last day of the month Pyanepsion, the priestess of Athena Polias and the Arrephoroi, a group of girls chosen to help in the making of the sacred peplos, set up the loom on which the enormous peplos was to be woven by the Ergastinai, another group of girls chosen to spend about nine months making the sacred peplos. They had to weave a theme of Athena's defeat of Enkelados and the Olympian's defeat of the Giants. The peplos of the statue was changed each year during the Plynteria.

The peplos played a role in the Athenian festival of the Great Panathenaea. Nine months before the festival, at the arts and crafts festival titled Chalkeia, a special peplos would begin to be woven by young women. This peplos was placed on the statue of Athena during the festival procession. The peplos had images of the mythic battle between gods and giants woven into its material and usually consisted of purple and saffron yellow cloth.

See also
Clothing in ancient Greece
Clothing in the ancient world
Delphos gown

References

External links

Peplos
Greek Dress
Peplum dresses

Greek clothing
Religious clothing
Athena